Harold Shapiro is the name of:

 Harold S. Shapiro (1928–2021), mathematician
 Harold Tafler Shapiro (born 1935), economist and former president of Princeton University and of the University of Michigan

See also
 Harold Shapero (1920–2013), American composer
 Harry Shapiro (disambiguation)